Gilan Deh or Gilandeh may refer to:
 Gilan Deh, Ardabil
 Gilandeh, Asalem, Talesh County, Gilan Province
 Gilandeh, Kharajgil, Asalem District, Talesh County, Gilan Province
 Gilan Deh, Kurdistan
 Gilandeh, Mazandaran